Malpighian is an attribute to several anatomical structures discovered by, described by or attributed to Marcello Malpighi:

 Malpighian corpuscle (disambiguation)
 Renal corpuscle, the initial filtering component of nephrons in the kidneys
 Splenic lymphoid nodules or white nodules, follicles in the white pulp of the spleen
 Malpighian layer of the skin, a term with various definitions
 Malpighian tubule system, an excretory and osmoregulatory system found in some insects, myriapods, arachnids and tardigrades

See also
 Malpighiales, an order of flowering plants
 Malpighia, a genus in the order